Jam Productions may refer to:

JAM Creative Productions, an American commercial music production
JAM Productions (software), an American computer game development company

See also
The Jam (production team), an American producing and recording duo
Jam-On Productions, a musical group that formed the basis of Newcleus